Broadly speaking, a gangway is a passageway through which to enter or leave.  Gangway may refer specifically refer to:

Passageways
 Gangway (nautical), a passage between the quarterdeck and the forecastle of a ship, and by extension, a passage through the side of a ship, an opening in the railing, or an articulated bridge or ramp, through which she may be boarded
 Jet bridge, a passenger boarding bridge to an airplane
 Any aisle (in British English)
 Any temporary passageway, such as one made of planks or at a construction site

Name
 Gangway (band), a Danish pop band
 Gangway (film), a 1937 British musical film
 Gangway (gay bar), a gay bar in San Francisco
 Gangway (magazine), an online literary magazine

See also
 Brake Gangwayed, a type of railway brake van
 Gangway connection, a connector between gangways of railway passenger cars